Salsåker-Ullångers IF is a Swedish football club located in Ullånger  in Kramfors Municipality, Västernorrland County.

Background
During the years 1984 to 2010 the club has existed in various forms covering the Höga Kusten area – namely Bjärtrå IS, Docksta BTK, Norabygdens IK, Nordingrå SK, Skogs IF and Salsåker-Ullångers IF – with football being the club's main activity.  The purpose of this collaborative project has been to be able to offer football as sport for to members of village clubs without those members having to leave their local club.

Successful cooperation between the local clubs first took place at youth football level but over the years has progressed to senior football.  The names of the teams in the league in the district over the years has varied from DUFF-84 (Docksta Ullånger Framtida Fotboll), Nora/Nordingrå, S/D Fotboll, NSD Höga Kusten and Höga Kusten Fotboll.

Special recognition was given to the club in May 2008 by the Ångermanlands Fotbollförbund for their work over 25 years in providing football in collaboration across a number of villages.

Since their foundation the club has participated mainly in the lower divisions of the Swedish football league system.  The club currently plays in Division 3 Mellersta Norrland which is the fifth tier of Swedish football. They play their home matches at the Kinavallen in Ullånger.

Salsåker-Ullångers IF are affiliated to the Ångermanlands Fotbollförbund.

Season to season

Salsåker-Ullångers IF were previously known as Höga Kusten Fotboll (or Högakusten) and SUIF/Docksta in the years prior to 2010.

Attendances

In recent seasons Salsåker-Ullångers IF have had the following average attendances:

The attendance record for Höga Kusten Fotboll (SUIF) was 465 spectators for the match against Kramfors-Alliansen on 27 June 2009 (Division 4 Ångermanland).

Footnotes

External links
 Salsåker-Ullångers IF – Official website

Sport in Västernorrland County
Football clubs in Västernorrland County
Association football clubs established in 1984
1984 establishments in Sweden